Chavanoz is a commune in the Isère department in southeastern France.

Geography
The Bourbre flows north through the eastern part of the commune, then flows into the Rhone.

Population

See also
Communes of the Isère department

References

Communes of Isère